Ernest Victor Morland Kitto (21 January 1871 – 27 December 1897) was a cricketer who made one first-class appearance for Canterbury in 1894–95.  Playing in a drawn match against Wellington, he made seven runs in the first-innings batting at number eight, and three in the second-innings after being promoted to number four.

References

External links
 
 

1871 births
1897 deaths
Scottish cricketers
Canterbury cricketers
Scottish emigrants to New Zealand
People who died at sea